White Rock Baptist Church is a historically African American church that was founded in Durham, NC, in 1866. The congregation first met in the home of Margaret Ruffin Faucette in Durham's Hayti neighborhood. The Reverends Zuck Horton and Samuel Daddy Hunt were the first ministers to lead the congregation.

Dr. Augustus Shepard, father of Dr. James E. Shepard, founder of North Carolina Central University led the congregation between 1901-1911.

A number of prominent African American citizens were members of White Rock Baptist Church, including Asa and Edna Spaulding, parents of Asa T. Spaulding, Jr., and Dr. Aaron Moore. Dr. Moore donated funds for a Sunday School building and started a library in the church's basement, which would later become the Durham Colored Library and then the Stanford L. Warren Public Library.

In 1960, just after the start of the sit-in movement at the Woolworth store in Greensboro, NC, Dr. Martin Luther King, Jr., gave a speech titled “A Creative Protest” at White Rock Baptist Church to a crowd estimated at 1,200. King made five appearances in Durham.

The original church building was demolished to make way for the Durham Freeway, and a new building was constructed further south on Fayetteville Street with the congregation moving in in 1977.

References

External Links 
White Rock Baptist Church.
Blackwell, Joyce. Upon This Rock: White Rock Baptist Church's Dynamic People and Their Influence in the Durham, North Carolina, Community, 1866-2016. Cary, NC: CaryPress International, 2018.

African-American history in Durham, North Carolina
Baptist churches in North Carolina
1866 establishments in North Carolina